Islamabad had an estimated population of 1,014,825 according to the 2017 Census.

Urdu, the national and first official language of the country, is predominantly spoken within the city due to the ethnic mix of populations. English, the second official language, is also commonly understood. Other languages include Punjabi and Pashto. The mother tongue of the majority of the population is Punjabi, at 54%. According to the 2021 Census, 20% of the population are Pashto speakers, 14% are Baloch , and the remaining 10% speak Urdu, Seraiki, Pahari or other languages.
The total migrant population of the city is 397,731, with the majority from Punjab (201,977). Around 116,614 of the migrated population came from Khyber Pakhtunkhwa, 75,143 from Sindh, 24,438 from Azad Kashmir, and 21,372 from other countries. Smaller populations emigrated from Federally Administered Tribal Areas, Balochistan, and Gilgit-Baltistan.

Islam is the largest religion in the city, with 95.53% of the population Muslim. Per 1998 census in rural areas this percentage is 98.80%, while in urban areas the percentage of Muslims is 93.83%. The second largest religion is Christianity, with 4.07% of the population, 0.94% in rural areas and 5.70% in the city. Other minorities 0.39% of the population.  
The majority of the population lies in the age group of 15–64 years, around 59.38%. Only 2.73% of the population is above 65 years of age; 37.90% is below the age of 15. Islamabad has the highest literacy rate in Pakistan, at 94%. 9.8% of the population has done intermediate education (equivalent to grades 11 and 12). 10.26% have a bachelor or equivalent degree while 5.2% have a master or equivalent degree. The labour force of Islamabad is 185,213 and the unemployment rate is 15.70%.

References

Islamabad
Islamabad
Islamabad